Florentino Ameghino is a town in Buenos Aires Province, Argentina. It is the administrative seat of the Florentino Ameghino Partido.

The town is named after Argentine naturalist, paleontologist, anthropologist and zoologist Florentino Ameghino.

External links

Populated places in Buenos Aires Province
Populated places established in 1910